Mapledurwell is a village in Hampshire, England, that is located south east of Basingstoke. The name Mapledurwell means 'maple tree spring.'

History
Recorded in the Domesday Book, the land was held by Anschill for Edward the Confessor. From 1086, it became the sole Hampshire estate of Hugh de Port, covering the parishes of Newnham, Up Nately and Andwell. Forfeited by Adam de Port in 1172, after the King gave the manor to Alan Basset, it was transferred to Hugh de Despenser in 1306, who was hanged by Queen Isabel in 1326. Returned to the Despenser family in 1337, it remained in their possession for two centuries. In 1528, William Frost of Avington granted the manor to Corpus Christi College, Oxford, which remained the major land owner until 1839. This later long period of ownership resulted in the continuation of small tenant farm holdings, and hence the relatively late enclosure of the farmlands, and retention of an open land setting and older "twisty" road layout. The present area of allotment land was awarded to the village under and Enclosure act of June 1863. The opening of the Basingstoke Canal from 1778, which ran through the northern half of Up Nately, and the expansion of the nearby brickworks brought many industrial jobs to the area.

Governance
The village of Mapledurwell is part of the civil parish of Mapledurwell and Up Nately and is part of the Basing ward of Basingstoke and Deane borough council. The borough council is a Non-metropolitan district of Hampshire County Council.

Further reading
John Hare, Jean Morrin and Stan Wright The Victoria History of Hampshire: Mapledurwell Institute of Historical Research, 2012

References

External links

 Mapledurwell parish council
 History of Mapledurwell
 Mapledurwell
 Map
 Conservation Area Appraisal: Mapledurwell
 Hampshire Treasures: Volume 2 (Basingstoke and Deane) pages 177, 179, 180, 181, 182, 183, 184, and 185

St Mary
 St Mary, Mapledurwell
 MAPLEDURWELL, St. Mary (1850-1854) Hampshire (Click on image of plan to the right of the page.) 
 Stained Glass Windows at St. Mary, Mapledurwell, Hampshire

Villages in Hampshire